DWRT (99.5 FM), on-air as 99.5 Play FM (stylized as PL>Y), is a 24-hour radio station owned and operated by Real Radio Network Inc. It is one of the partner stations of Tiger 22 Media. Its studio is located at Unit 906-B, Paragon Plaza Building, EDSA corner Reliance St., Mandaluyong, and its transmitter is located at Palos Verdes, Antipolo.

History

1976–2006: The first 99.5 RT
Trans-Radio Broadcasting Corporation was established in 1971 by Emilio Tuason after he acquired the AM radio franchise (980 kHz) of Transit Broadcasting Corporation, owned by the Vergara family. Under Trans-Radio, the AM station adopted the call sign DZTR-AM “Radyo Pilipino” (which is not anyway related to the eponymous AM radio network owned by the Radio Corporation of the Philippines). In 1976, Trans-Radio acquired an FM radio franchise (99.5 MHz) and adopted the call sign DWRT-FM. It began broadcasting on September 6, 1976, as "99.5 RT", which was the first Top 40 station in the Philippines. The station was initially located at 10 Doña Natividad Building at Quezon Avenue (near the Welcome Rotonda) in Quezon City. After the building caught fire two years later, it transferred to Suite 608 of the Pacific Bank Building (now known as Security Bank Centre) at 6776 Ayala Avenue in Makati. Tuason also became one of the station's deejays (his on-air names were "J.W. Christian" and "E.T.") until personal problems forced his retirement from the station in 1987. Mike Pedero, who was also one of its deejays, took care of the programming until he left the station for RK96 Real Radio in 1980.

99.5 RT became famous for playing the hits months ahead of most other music stations because its programming philosophy did not pander to the masses nor cater to the lowest common denominator.  It brought the latest American and British hits to the local audience as soon as they were released by the artists.  One of the most notable examples of this was in the early 1980s when RT broke in the song "More to Lose" by the obscure English new wave duo, Seona Dancing.  The station kept listeners guessing the identity of the song by announcing the title as "Medium" and done by the artist "Fade", two words which were actually descriptions of the song: medium tempo with an ending that faded out.

From 1983 to 1986, RT was one of the FM stations that delivered news on the assassination of Benigno Aquino Jr. as well as his funeral, the Snap Elections of 1986 between Ferdinand Marcos and Corazon Aquino and the People Power Revolution.

On October 11, 1985, rival station Kiss FM 101.1 (now 101.1 Yes The Best) was launched with most of the RT jocks manning that station. It toppled RT in the ratings and the latter's revenues dropped. A few months later in February 1986 after the EDSA Revolution, RT reformatted as the Red Hot Radio. It played only new wave music similar to WXB 102 (now 102.7 Star FM), albeit more commercial. This proved to be unsuccessful, leading to the station reverting to its original format a year later. In 1989, it switched to a modern rock format. After a few years, it reverted back to its original format once more and regained its success.

Programming
Over the years, RT became popular with different slogans such as "The Sound Of The City" (197677), "Your Radio Music Authority" (197879), "The Rhythm Of The City" (19801996; 20082012), "Red Hot Radio" (19861988), "Your Maximum Music Authority" (19881996), "Source For The Best Hits" (19961998) and "Your Music Authority" (19982001), from 2001 to December 18, 2006, before it was rebranded, 99.5 RT's slogan was "The Most Hit Music".

RT was also home to some of America's popular hit countdown shows like American Top 40 and the Rick Dees Weekly Top 40.  In the early 1980s (specifically 198384), RT also ventured into the music-video business.  As one of the pioneer music video shows in the Philippines, Rhythm Of The City which aired on Monday at 7:30pm on then government-owned MBS-4 (now known as PTV-4), showcased then ground-breaking videos from artists such as Men At Work, Naked Eyes, Real Life, Michael Jackson, and some of the best acts in North America during a time when then-fledgling MTV had not yet established its presence in the Asian region.

It is also known for its oldies show, 24K Friday playing the hits from the 1970s, 1980s and 1990s.

It was the first radio station in the Philippines to have ventured into having a home on the Internet, launching its first bulletin board in 1995.

New ownership
On June 14, 1996, Trans-Radio Broadcasting Corporation sold DWRT-FM to the Vera family (owners of then-rival and now sister station Magic 89.9), and moved to the adjacent Royal Match Building (6780 Ayala Avenue). Under new management, the station tried its best to maintain its upscale and niche-market on-air identity and programming format, unlike many other stations which reformatted after being sold.

In April 1999, it moved to its present location at the Paragon Plaza Building, along EDSA, Mandaluyong.

Over the next few years, 99.5 RT's sound slowly became similar to other CHR radio stations in Manila. By 2004, most of its veteran DJs had left and were replaced by younger ones. During the period, programs like Up and Coming (a new music countdown show, which later split into two: RT Top 10 Biggies (daily) and the RT40 (weekly)), On the Decks (a dance show hosted and with live dance music mixes by Dj David Ardiente, which later became David's House), RT Sunday Sessions (where various artists performed live in the radio station's studio), The Get Up and Go Show with Joe Schmoe, Alex and Lellie, Dinner and Drive Show (formerly known as Da Brainy Bunch), and The Playground with Da Kid, Lexi Locklear and BB Fred were developed. Beginning in 2004, RT put up an annual concert event called, "Ripe Tomatoes", featuring up to 30 OPM bands playing back-to-back on a single night.

In 2006, a corporate decision was made to rename 99.5 RT to HiT FM starting January 2007. Thus, at midnight on December 18, 2006, the station signed off as the original iteration of 99.5 RT. For the next two weeks, the station played non-stop music, with occasional liners from the DJs, and teasers about the new station. On January 1, 2007, it DWRT-FM officially signed on as HiT 99.5.

2007–2008: Hit FM
On January 1, 2007, Hit 99.5 signed on and presented almost-uninterrupted music programming with live announcers and its new programs officially debuted on January 8, 2007. The programming was essentially the same as RT's, but more content-driven rather than music oriented similar to sister station in Davao 105.9 Mix FM. It catered to a young audience, whose demographics included youths in high-school and college; from the aspirational to the affluent backgrounds. In August of that year, its on-air name was changed to 99.5 Hit FM.

99.5 Hit FM signed off for the last time on Holy Wednesday, March 19, 2008. Some Hit FM jocks later moved to Jam 88.3 and Magic 89.9. The last song "Nice to Know You" by Incubus was played before the holy week.

2008: Campus

The 99.5 frequency resumed broadcast as 99.5 Campus FM on Easter Sunday, March 23, 2008, with some of the announcers coming from Barangay LS 97.1 (formerly "Campus Radio 97.1 WLS FM") and some of the retained Hit FM jocks.  The new incarnation of 99.5 reflected the spirit of the former Campus Radio.  Early in May 2008, it was renamed Campus 99.5. The on-air format was essentially the same, with familiar programs and segments and jocks from Campus Radio 97.1 WLS FM re-introduced later on.

Collectively, the station's on-air announcers were known as the Campus Air Force, as they were with DWLS-FM.

On the afternoon of August 14 at 4pm, the management abruptly discontinued Campus 99.5, due to management difficulties. The station then switched to an automated all-music format with only pre-recorded station ID's played intermittently between songs. BrewRats! continued on its usual schedule until August 21, after which it went on a one-week hiatus. On August 24, a new set of stingers announced that a new format and station image would be premiered in days.

Campus Radio revived on March 21, 2009, as an internet radio station.

2008–2012: The second 99.5 RT

On September 1, 2008, at 6am, after two weeks of automated music programming, the station resumed its broadcast under the reinstated name 99.5 RT. Joshua Z was the first DJ to go on board that morning, followed by other jocks who have worked with the frequency's three incarnations (mostly from the RT roster and HiT and one from Campus). The station initially reused its old and familiar slogan, "The Rhythm Of The City". The playlist is more progressive and experimental, attempting to sound like RT's first Iteration. The deejays have a collective tone similar to parent station, Magic 89.9, due to the use of Tagalog-English or "Taglish" during live spiels.

They also introduced its 2nd slogan, from 2009 to 2010, dubbing the station as playing "The Best Music on the Planet", which is also used in sister station in Davao, 105.9 Mix FM. For every Summer, it brought back the "Red Hot Radio" slogan, which was originally used from 1983 to 1988. Since 2010, they launched The Farm, an on-air training program for the beginner/student jocks.

Since October 2010, RT repositioned itself into rock-leaning CHR, earning its 3rd slogan, "The Drive", after the Sunday night-only program of the same name. It was a call for the demise of NU 107, which happened a month later. Since then, they played a minority of songs from the 90s and early 2000s (at most 3 tracks per hour) to promote 24K Weekend. In June 2011, RT repositioned itself once again into Adult CHR with a slight indie lean, dropping "The Drive" in favor of its previous slogan "The Best Music on the Planet".

During mid-October 2012, management decided to reformat the station. Half of its on-air crew were dismissed (replaced by selected Junior Jocks from Magic 89.9), and some of the shows ended. The station continued to air using 99.5 RT, but with new teasers (which began a week before), until December 9 when 99.5 RT signed off for the last time. Koji Moralez was last to board and its last song was "Kings and Queens" by Thirty Seconds to Mars.

2012-present: Play FM
On December 10, 2012, at 6am, the station signed on as 99.5 Play FM. Socialite and eventologist Tim Yap, RT mainstay Sam Oh, and former Magic jock Nikko were the first jocks to go on board that morning, followed by the remaining RT jocks and selected jocks from Magic. The very first song played was "Play" by Jennifer Lopez. The programming and imaging at that time is more identical to that of its parent station, Magic 89.9, and the defunct 99.5 Hit FM, albeit catering to a young audience, whose demographics included kids in high-school and college; from the aspirational to the affluent backgrounds.

The official jingles and audio imaging of Play FM were later launched on September 15, 2014, months after Rizal "Sonny B" Aportadera's transfer to the station. The jingles were made by German audio imaging company Sound Quadrat and its US-based subsidiary Benztown Branding, whose other clients include leading European CHR stations BBC Radio 1 (United Kingdom), Europa Plus (Russia) and NRJ (France), as well as Play FM's former sister station 103.5 K-Lite (now under the ownership of Advanced Media Broadcasting System).

Since its inception, the on-air staff has the liberty of time to talk before continuing the music playlist. However, with the relaunch to its current format, most of them are given not more than 60 seconds every time their voices go on the air (except for Paid Advertisements or promotional/sponsor announcements). This strategy is being used to allow more songs to be played during the broadcast. The time-limit is not applied to several shows like Club Play and Play It Live.

According to AGB Nielsen Philippines' Vehicle Coincidental Radio Listenership Survey (December 2014), 99.5 Play FM is the fastest-growing FM radio station in Mega Manila. From nothing to no. 11 in 7 months. Most of the listeners are 16–25 years of age.

In the wake of the Duterte administration, Sonny B and Carlo Jose left the station; and were appointed by PCOO Secretary Martin Andanar for the revitalization of the state-run Philippine Broadcasting Service. At the same time, Lil' Joey became station manager in January 2017. The station updated their jingles, followed by launching its tagline "Just Press Play" along its current slogan "Number 1 for New Music and all the Hits".

As of early 2018, Magic DJ CJ Rivera is standing in as station manager.

Compilation CDs of DWRT-FM
24K Friday (MCA Music Philippines, 2006)
24K Friday 2 (MCA Music Philippines, 2007)
Freestyle: "Playlist" (Viva Records, 2009)

References

External links
 

Contemporary hit radio stations in the Philippines
Radio stations in Metro Manila
Radio stations established in 1976
Tiger 22 Media Corporation